Mullaitivu District ( Mullaittīvu Māvaṭṭam) is one of the 25 districts of Sri Lanka, the second level administrative division of the country. The district is administered by a District Secretariat headed by a District Secretary (previously known as a Government Agent) appointed by the central government of Sri Lanka. The capital of the district is the town of Mullaitivu.

History
Parts of present-day Mullaitivu District was part of the pre-colonial Jaffna kingdom. The district then came under Portuguese, Dutch and British control. In 1815 the British gained control of the entire island of Ceylon. They divided the island into three ethnic based administrative structures: Low Country Sinhalese, Kandyan Sinhalese and Tamil. The district, which was then part of Vanni District, was part of the Tamil administration. In 1833, in accordance with the recommendations of the Colebrooke-Cameron Commission, the ethnic based administrative structures were unified into a single administration divided into five geographic provinces. Vanni District, together with Jaffna District and Mannar District, formed the new Northern Province.

Vanni District was later renamed Mullaitivu District and then Vavuniya District. The district was colonised in the second half of the 18th century by residents from Jaffna Peninsula, primarily from Alaveddy, Udupiddy and Navaly. At the time that Ceylon gained independence, Vavuniya was one of the three districts located in the Northern Province. Mullaitivu District was carved out of the northern part of Vavuniya District together with parts of the then Jaffna District, Mannar District and Trincomalee District in September 1978.

Mullaitivu District was under the control of rebel Liberation Tigers of Tamil Eelam for many years during the civil war. The district was recaptured by the Sri Lankan military in early 2009.

Geography
Mullaitivu District is located in the north east of Sri Lanka in the Northern Province.

Administrative units
Mullaitivu District is divided into 6 Divisional Secretary's Division (DS Divisions), each headed by a Divisional Secretary (previously known as an Assistant Government Agent). The DS Divisions are further sub-divided into 136 Grama Niladhari Divisions (GN Divisions).

Demographics

Population
Mullaitivu District's population was 91,947 in 2012. The population of the district is mostly Sri Lankan Tamil.

The population of the district, like the rest of the north and east of Sri Lanka, has been heavily affected by the civil war. The war killed an estimated 100,000 people. Several hundred thousand Sri Lankan Tamils, possibly as much as one million, emigrated to India or to the West during the war. Many Sri Lankan Tamils also moved to the relative safety of the capital Colombo. Most of the Sri Lankan Moors and Sinhalese who lived in the district fled to other parts of Sri Lanka or were forcibly expelled by the rebel Liberation Tigers of Tamil Eelam, though most of them have returned to the district since the end of the civil war.

Ethnicity

Religion

Politics and government

Local government

Mullaitivu District has four local authorities all of which are Divisional Councils (Pradesha Sabhai or Pradeshiya Sabha).

Notes

References

External links

 Mullaitivu District Secretariat

 
1978 establishments in Sri Lanka
Districts of Sri Lanka